George W. Search House is a historic home located at Shickshinny, Luzerne County, Pennsylvania.  It was built about 1860 and altered between 1916 and 1928.  It is a two-story, two bay wide rectangular gable front building.  It measures 26 feet wide by 53 feet deep, and is clad in clapboard.  It features stained glass windows and a wraparound porch.

It was added to the National Register of Historic Places in 1983.

References

Houses on the National Register of Historic Places in Pennsylvania
Houses completed in 1928
Houses in Luzerne County, Pennsylvania
National Register of Historic Places in Luzerne County, Pennsylvania